The East Germany men's national water polo team was the representative for East Germany in international men's water polo.

Results

Olympic Games
As United Team of Germany (see Germany men's national water polo team)
1964 – 6th place
As East Germany
1968 — 6th place

References

Water polo
Men's national water polo teams
National water polo teams in Europe
National water polo teams by country
Former national water polo teams
 
Men's sport in Germany